Peter Phillips  (born 28 December 1949) is a Jamaican politician who is currently the MP for Saint Andrew East Central.

Phillips is the former president of the People's National Party and former leader of the Opposition in Jamaica. He served as Minister of Finance and Planning of Jamaica from 2012 to 2016. He is Member of Parliament for East Central St Andrew.

Early life
Phillips was born in Kingston to Mico Teachers' College lecturer Aubrey Sylvester Phillips and civil servant Thelma Limonius Phillips. Aubrey was a graduate of Mico, where he had roomed with Howard Cooke, who would later become Governor-General of Jamaica. 

Peter Phillips spent some of his infancy in Manchester Parish where both his mother's and father's parents lived. The family returned to Kingston and he started pre-school there before moving to Saint Ann Parish where his father took up a new job as principal of Moneague Teachers' College. 

Peter lived in the United Kingdom between ages six and nine while his father studied for a PhD there, and then returned to Jamaica, where he attended Jamaica College as a boarder.

Phillips holds a bachelor's degree in Economics, a Master's in Government (from The University of the West Indies), and a Doctorate in Sociology from the State University of New York at Binghamton (USA).

Political career
Phillips first entered parliament as an appointed senator after the People's National Party won the 1989 general elections. He served as Minister of State in the Office of the Prime Minister until 1991, when he was appointed PNP General Secretary and Minister of Special Projects in the Office of the Prime Minister. He remained in post until 1994, when he was elected to parliament as the member for Saint Andrew East Central. He served as MP for that constituency for the duration of his political career.

Phillips served as Minister of Health to P.J. Patterson from 1995 to 1997. In 1998, Patterson appointed him Minister of Transport and Works. He was elected a vice president of the PNP in 1999, serving with Portia Simpson Miller. He was subsequently appointed Minister of National Security. 

Phillips twice unsuccessfully ran for President of the PNP in 2006 and 2008. He lost ministerial office when the PNP lost the 2007 elections. However, after the party won the 2011 elections, he was appointed Minister of Finance and Public Service.

Party leader
The PNP lost the 2016 elections, after which Simpson Miller stood down as leader and Phillips won the subsequent leadership election in 2017. In 2019 he was challenged for the leadership by Peter Bunting, but was re-elected in the September vote. 

In the 2020 Jamaican general election, he was defeated by current Prime Minister, Andrew Holness, by a 49-14 seat margin. However, the turnout at this election was just 37%, probably affected by the coronavirus pandemic. He resigned as Opposition Leader and PNP President after the defeat, triggering the 2020 People's National Party leadership election.

References

1949 births
Living people
People's National Party (Jamaica) politicians
Members of the House of Representatives of Jamaica
Finance ministers of Jamaica
Ministers of Health of Jamaica
Government ministers of Jamaica
Politicians from Kingston, Jamaica
20th-century Jamaican politicians
21st-century Jamaican politicians
Members of the 10th Parliament of Jamaica
Members of the 11th Parliament of Jamaica
Members of the 12th Parliament of Jamaica
Members of the 13th Parliament of Jamaica
Members of the 14th Parliament of Jamaica